The 1929 Georgetown Hoyas football team represented Georgetown University during the 1929 college football season. Led by Lou Little in his sixth and final season as head coach, the team went 5–2–2.

Schedule

References

Georgetown
Georgetown Hoyas football seasons
Georgetown Hoyas football